Patrick J. Regan (March 25, 1882October 30, 1943) was an officer in the United States Army who received the Medal of Honor for his actions during World War I.

Biography
Regan was born in Middleborough, Massachusetts on March 25, 1882 and died October 30, 1943. He is buried in Mount Olivet Cemetery, Bloomfield, New Jersey.

Medal of Honor citation
Rank and organization: Second Lieutenant, U.S. Army, 115th Infantry, 29th Division. Place and date: At Bois-de-Consenvoye, France; October 8, 1918. Entered service at: Los Angeles, California. Birth: March 25, 1882; Middleborough, Massachusetts.  General Orders: War Department, General Orders No. 50 (April 12, 1919).

Citation:

While leading his platoon against a strong enemy machinegun nest which had held up the advance of two companies, Second Lieutenant Regan divided his men into three groups, sending one group to either flank, and he himself attacking with an automatic rifle team from the front. Two of the team were killed outright, while Second Lieutenant Regan and the third man were seriously wounded, the latter unable to advance. Although severely wounded, Second Lieutenant Regan dashed with empty pistol into the machinegun nest, capturing 30 Austrian gunners and four machineguns. This gallant deed permitted the companies to advance, avoiding a terrific enemy fire. Despite his wounds, he continued to lead his platoon forward until ordered to the rear by his commanding officer.

Military awards
Regan's military decorations and awards include the following:

See also

List of Medal of Honor recipients
List of Medal of Honor recipients for World War I

References

External links

1882 births
1943 deaths
United States Army Medal of Honor recipients
United States Army officers
People from Middleborough, Massachusetts
Military personnel from Massachusetts
World War I recipients of the Medal of Honor
Burials in New Jersey
United States Army personnel of World War I